Jule Brand (born 16 October 2002) is a German footballer who plays as a defender, midfielder or winger for VfL Wolfsburg and the Germany women's national team. In 2022, she won the first Tuttosport's "Best European Golden Girl" award.

Club career
Brand played at club level for 1899 Hoffenheim, including in the Champions League. She joined VfL Wolfsburg in summer 2022.

International career
Brand made her senior international debut for Germany in a friendly on 10 April 2021, coming on as a substitute in the 60th minute for Tabea Waßmuth against Australia. Two minutes later, she scored her first international goal, extending Germany to a 3–0 lead, before assisting the fourth goal scored by Laura Freigang in the 65th minute. The home match finished as a 5–2 win for Germany.

Career statistics

Scores and results list Germany's goal tally first, score column indicates score after each Brand goal.

Honours
Germany

 UEFA Women's Championship runner-up: 2022

Individual 

 Best European Golden Girl: 2022

References

External links
 
 
 
 

2002 births
Living people
People from Germersheim
Footballers from Rhineland-Palatinate
German women's footballers
Germany women's youth international footballers
Germany women's international footballers
Women's association football defenders
Women's association football midfielders
TSG 1899 Hoffenheim (women) players
Frauen-Bundesliga players
2. Frauen-Bundesliga players
UEFA Women's Euro 2022 players
VfL Wolfsburg (women) players